"Glozel est Authentique!" is a 1984 role-playing game adventure for Call of Cthulhu, 	
written by E. S. Erkes and C. Rawling, and published by Theatre of the Mind Enterprises (TOME).

Contents
"Glozel est Authentique!" features two scenarios: the title scenario sends investigators to the site of an archeological dig in France to determine its authenticity, and "Secrets of the Kremlin" sends characters to the heart of Stalin's Moscow.

Reception
Stephen Kyle reviewed Glozel est Authentique! for White Dwarf #59, giving it an overall rating of 5 out of 10, and stated that "some of TOME'''s previous CoC adventure packs have been notable for their poor layout, terrible artwork and hordes of stereotypical Germans. Well, just for a change, this one has terrible layout, quite good artwork and hordes of stereotypical French and Russians."

William A. Barton reviewed "Glozel est Authentique!" in Space Gamer No. 71. Barton commented that "Overall, "Glozel est Authentique!" is probably TOME's best CoC adventure pack to date. If you've liked TOME's past releases, you'll love this one; even if you haven't cared for past adventures, this is one you should take a look at - as a French/Russian sourcebook for CoC'' play, if nothing else."

References

Call of Cthulhu (role-playing game) adventures
Role-playing game supplements introduced in 1984